Antibiotics and Chemotherapy was a peer-reviewed medical journal covering antimicrobial and cancer chemotherapy published by Karger Publishers. It was established in 1955 as Antibiotica et Chemotherapia: Fortschritte. Advances. Progrès, obtaining its current name in 1971. It ceased publication in 2000.

External links

Pharmacology journals
Oncology journals
Karger academic journals
English-language journals
Publications established in 1955
Publications disestablished in 2000
1955 establishments in Switzerland